Ocellularia krathingensis is a species of corticolous (bark-dwelling) lichen in the family Graphidaceae. Found in Thailand, it was formally described as a new species in 2002 by lichenologists Natsurang Homchantara and Brian J. Coppins. The type specimen was collected by the first author from Khao Khitchakut National Park (Chanthaburi Province). The specific epithet krathingensis refers to the Namtok Krathing fall, which is close to the type locality.

The lichen has a pale greenish grey thallus with a rough to verruculose (warted) texture. It grows on trees and lianas.

References

krathingensis
Lichen species
Lichens described in 2002
Lichens of Thailand
Taxa named by Brian John Coppins
Taxa named by Natsurang Homchantara